Peter Barrett designed and provided the artwork for a set of United Kingdom postage stamps depicting dogs in 1979. A commemorative first day cover was also brought out.

Illustrations

Peter Barrett's career as an illustrator took off after writing and illustrating a three-book series for very young children, along with his wife Susan Barrett. Published by Ward Lock, the books (The circle Sara drew, The square Ben drew, The line Sophie drew) became very popular. Barrett subsequently concentrated on animal art and illustrations, illustrating numerous children's non-fiction books, specializing in dogs, horses and dinosaurs. His illustrations for Birdwatcher's Diary, by Roger Lovegrove, in 1982 drew critical acclaim.

A biographical perspective of his work was published in 1986 by his wife Susan Barrett titled "Travels with a wildlife artist: the living landscape of Greece". Peter Barrett illustrated the book and also contributed to the text. In the decades of the 1980s and 1990s, his stature as an animal artist and children's book illustrator has grown hand in hand. Peter Barrett illustrated reprints and collections of famous animal centric stories and books by Gerald Durrell, Desmond Morris and James Herriot. He illustrated a number of books under the highly popular Little Golden Books label for children. He has also illustrated the 1987 Random House edition of the children's classic The Wind in the Willows, by Kenneth Grahame.

Bibliography

The world's Christmas: Stories from many lands, written by Olive Wyon, illustrated by Peter Barrett; Fortress Press, London, 1965
The circle Sara drew, written and illustrated by Peter Barrett and Susan Barrett; Ward Lock Ltd, London, 1970
The square Ben drew, written and illustrated by Peter Barrett and Susan Barrett; Ward Lock Ltd, London, 1970
The line Sophie drew, written and illustrated by Peter Barrett and Susan Barrett; Ward Lock Ltd, London, 1970
The book of fantastic insects, by Jane Carruth, illustrated by Peter Barrett; Octopus Books, London, 1975
The book of fantastic birds, by Jane Carruth, illustrated by Peter Barrett; Octopus Books, London, 1975
A closer look at elephants, written by John Holbrook, illustrated by Peter Barrett; Penguin Books, London, 1976
A closer look at prehistoric mammals, written by L.B. Halstead, illustrated by Peter Barrett; Closer Look Books, London, 1976
A closer look at horses, written by Neil Thomson, illustrated by Peter Barrett; Penguin Books, London, 1977
The amazing fact book of birds, by Rosalind Lenga, illustrated by Peter Barrett; A & P Books, London, 1978
The amazing fact book of insects, by Casey Horton, illustrated by Peter Barrett; A & P Books, London, 1979
The duck, by Erica Proper and Arthur Proper, illustrated by Peter Barrett; Macdonald Educational, London, 1979
The wonderful world of nature, by Maurice Burton, illustrated by Peter Barrett, Elizabeth Cooper and Michel Cuisin; Octopus Books, London, 1979
Horses, ed. Henry Pluckrose, illustrated by Peter Barrett and Maurice Wilson; Franklin Watts, London, 1979
A countryman's year, by Alan C. Jenkins, illustrated by Peter Barrett; Webb and Bower, Exeter, 1980
Birdwatcher's Diary, by Roger Lovegrove, illustrations by Peter Barrett; Hutchinson, London, 1982
Birds, by Tessa Board, illustrated by Peter Barrett; Franklin Watts, London, 1983
Mammals, by Tessa Board, illustrated by Peter Barret; Franklin Watts, London, 1983
(More About) The Duck, Vol. 4, by Anne-Marie Dalmais and Arthur Proper, illustrations by Peter Barrett; Rourke Publishing, USA, 1983
Only One Woof, by James Herriot, illustrated by Peter Barrett; Michael Joseph / Adam & Charles Black, London, 1983
Moses the Kitten, by James Herriot, illustrated by Peter Barrett; Michael Joseph / Adam & Charles Black, London, 1984
Travels with a wildlife artist: the living landscape of Greece, written by Peter and Susan Barrett; Columbus Books, London, 1986
The Wind in the Willows, by Kenneth Grahame, illustrated by Peter Barrett; Random House, London, 1987
My family and other animals, by Gerald Durrell, illustrated by Gerald Durrell and Peter Barrett; Grafton Books, London, 1987
Dinosaur Discoveries (Big Little Golden Books), by Robert A. Bell, illustrated by Peter Barrett; Goldencraft, Racine, Wisconsin, 1988
Horses and Ponies, by Rosanna Hansen, illustrated by Peter Barrett; Little Golden Books, NY, 1988
My first book of animals, by Jenny Wood, illustrated by Peter Barrett and John Butler; Little Brown and Co, London, 1989
After the Dinosaurs: The Story of Prehistoric Mammals and Man (Big Little Golden Books), by James C. Shooter, illustrations by Peter Barrett; Goldencraft, Racine, Wisconsin, 1989
Amazing Dinosaur Facts, written by Robert Bell, illustrated by Peter Barrett; Golden Books, NY, 1990
All About Wild Animals, by John Messenger (hardcover) / Michael Chinery (paperback), illustrated by Peter Barrett; Kingfisher Books, London, 1991
James Herriot's Treasury for Children, by James Herriot, illustrated by Peter Barrett and Ruth Brown; St. Martin's Press, New York, 1992
Don't wake the animals, by Annie Ingle, illustrated by Peter Barrett; Random House, London, 1992
Dinosaur babies, by Lucille Recht Penner, illustrated by Peter Barrett; Random House, London, 1992
A forest tree house, by Sheryl A. Reda, illustrated by Peter Barrett; World Book, USA, 1992
The glow-in-the-dark dinosaur skeletons, by Annie Ingle, illustrated by Peter Barrett; Random House, London, 1993
Find out about lions and tigers, by Jill Hughes and Richard Orr, illustrated by Peter Barrett and Maurice Wilson; Trafalgar Square, London, 1993 (1985?)
The World of Animals, by Desmond Morris, illustrated by Peter Barrett; Jonathan Cape, London, 1993
 S-s-snake !, by Lucille Recht Penner, illustrated by Peter Barrett; Random House, London, 1994
 I Can Read About Baby Animals, by Elizabeth Warren, illustrated by Peter Barrett; Troll Communication, NY, 1995
A day in the life of a baby bear, by Susan Barrett, illustrated by Peter Barrett; Whistlestop Publications, 1996
A day in the life of a baby deer, by Susan Barrett, illustrated by Peter Barrett; Whistlestop Publications, 1996
A day in the life of a baby dinosaur, by Lee Randall, illustrated by Peter Barrett; Whistlestop Publications, 1996
A day in the life of a puppy, by Susan Barrett, illustrated by Peter Barrett; Whistlestop Publications, 1997
A day in the life of a kitten, by Susan Barrett, illustrated by Peter Barrett; Whistlestop Publications, 1997
 I Can Read About Manatees, by Janet Palazzo-Craig, illustrated by Peter Barrett; Troll Communication, NY, 1998
I didn't know that only some big cats can roar, by Claire Llewellyn, illustrated by Peter Barrett, Jonathan Pointer and Jo Moore; Millbrook Press, London, 1999
Extinct! Creatures of the past, by Mary Batten, illustrated by Peter Barrett; Golden Books, NY, 2000
The world of horses, by Toni Webber, ed. Harriet Brown, illustrated by Peter Barrett; Millbrook Press, London, 2002
Nature Unfolds: The Rocky Mountains and Deserts, by Gerard Cheshire, illustrated by Peter Barrett; Crabtree Publishing, USA, 2002
Dia Y Noche En Los Bosques (Day And Night in the Forest), by Perez Villanueva, Luis Esteban, Peter Barrett and Susan Barrett; Ediciones Sm, USA, 2004
The Illustrated Encyclopedia of Birds of the World : The Ultimate Identification Guide to Over 1600 Birds, Profiling Habitat, Nesting, Behaviour and Food, by David Alderton, illustrations by Peter Barrett; National Book Network, USA, 2005
James Herriot's Treasury of Inspirational Stories for Children, by James Herriot, illustrated by Peter Barrett and Ruth Brown; St. Martin's, New York, 2005
Three Little Pigs: 65th Anniversary Edition, written and illustrated by Peter Barrett; Ladybird Books, London, 2005
Evolution: The Story of Life, by Robert Palmer. University of California Press, Berkeley, 2009

References

External links
 Association of Illustrators: Member Profile

Animal artists
20th-century English painters
English male painters
21st-century English painters
21st-century English male artists
English illustrators
English children's writers
1935 births
Living people
British children's book illustrators
English male writers
20th-century English male artists